Trutzi from Trutzberg (German: Die Trutze von Trutzberg) is a 1922 German silent comedy film directed by Peter Ostermayr and Ernst B. Hey and starring Toni Wittels and Viktor Gehring.

It was shot at the Bavaria Studios in Munich. The film's sets were designed by the art director Willy Reiber.

Cast
 Carl Dalmonico as Burgpfaff 
 Viktor Gehring as Schäfer Lien 
 Curt Gerdes as Ritter Melchior, Trutz auf Trutzberg 
 Theo Kasper as Junker Eberhard 
 Hermann Pfanz as Ritter Korbin auf Püchstein 
 Camilo Sacchetto as Heinrich von der Seeburg 
 Thea Steinbrecher as Magd Pernella, genannt "das rote Übel" 
 Franz Stury as Herzog 
 Hildegard Wall as Tochter des Junkers 
 Toni Wittels as Frau Engelein

See also
 The Shepherd from Trutzberg (1959)

References

Bibliography
 Grange, William. Cultural Chronicle of the Weimar Republic. Scarecrow Press, 2008.

External links

1922 films
Films of the Weimar Republic
Films directed by Peter Ostermayr
German silent feature films
German black-and-white films
Bavaria Film films
Films shot at Bavaria Studios
German comedy films
1922 comedy films
Films set in the 15th century
Films based on German novels
Films based on works by Ludwig Ganghofer
Silent comedy films
1920s German films
1920s German-language films